Gerardo Morales may refer to:
 Gerardo Morales (footballer) (born 1975), Uruguayan football keeper
 Gerardo Morales (politician) (born 1959), Argentine politician